The World Land Trust is a UK registered charity. It raises money to buy and then protect environmentally-threatened land in Africa, Asia, and Central and South America.

History

The trust was founded in 1989 as the Programme for Belize to raise money to privately buy land in Belize to protect tropical rain forests in collaboration with Massachusetts Audubon Society. The organisation later changed its name to the World Wide Land Conservation Trust, and then to World Land Trust. John Burton was chief executive for thirty years until 2019, when Catherine Barnard took over.

A U.S. partner organisation, World Land Trust - US was renamed Rainforest Trust in 2013. The Trust has since developed to help purchase and conserve land in over 20 countries worldwide and has an annual income of £4.9 million in 2019.

The patrons of the trust are Sir David Attenborough, Steve Backshall, Chris Packham, and David Gower. Supporters include Bill Oddie, Tony Hawks, Mark Carwardine and Nick Baker.

In 2014 the trust held a "Controversial Conservation Debate: 'Killing Other Peoples’ Birds’" with Chris Packham in London. It discussed the impact of sport hunting on wildlife and conservation.

Projects

Projects include:

 purchase since 2007 of Atlantic forest in Brazil to expand the Reserva Ecológica Guapiaçu, with the British and Irish Association of Zoos and Aquariums
 purchase of land now incorporated into the Buenaventura Reserve, working with Fundacion de Conservacion Jocotoco
 establishment of Indian elephant corridors in India, working with the International Fund for Animal Welfare, the IUCN National Committee of the Netherlands, Elephant Family and Wildlife Trust of India.
 research in Iran on the Iranian subspecies of cheetah, with the Iranian Cheetah Society.
 raising £1 million to purchase land to connect two protected areas of rainforest and create an Orangutan corridor in Malaysian Borneo, with LEAP and Hutan
 purchase of land at Sierra Gorda in Mexico, with Grupo Ecológico Sierra Gorda
 implementation of a REDD+ project in the Atlantic Forest of Paraguay with Guyra Paraguay
 establishment of the Philippine Reef & Rainforest Project on Danjugan Island
 Kites Hill Reserve, Gloucestershire, United Kingdom, which was donated to the Trust and is managed as a nature reserve
 Jungle for Jaguars campaign to raise £600,000 for Corozal Sustainable Future Initiative to purchase and protect  in Belize
 management of the conservatory Wyld Court (now The Living Rainforest) - a tropical forest exhibit, in Hampstead Norreys.

References

Environmental organisations based in the United Kingdom
Organizations established in 1989
Land trusts